Kevin King and Juan Carlos Spir were the defending champions, but lost to Duilio Beretta and Martín Cuevas in the quarterfinals.

Marcelo Demoliner and João Souza won the title by defeating Duilio Beretta and Martín Cuevas 6–4, 6–4 in the final.

Seeds

Draw

Draw

References
 Main Draw

Quito Challenger - Doubles
2014 Doubles